Tushita is a centre for the study and practice of Buddhism from the Tibetan Mahayana tradition in Himachal Pradesh in northern India. It is located in the forested hills above the town of McLeod Ganj in village Dharamkot. The centre offers Introduction to Buddhism Courses and intermediate level courses for those who have already taken one of these introduction courses besides conducting Group Practice Retreats for practitioners of Tibetan Buddhism.

Due to the coronavirus pandemic, Tushita has move to free online programmes since March 2020.

History
After opening Kopan Monastery in Kathmandu, Lama Thubten Yeshe and his main student Lama Zopa Rinpoche decided to open a sister centre in response to the growing demand from their western students. In 1972, along with a few of their Western students, the Lamas bought an old colonial house on a hill above McLeod Ganj town at village Dharamkot in the Indian state of Himachal Pradesh. Courses were started at the centre founded there, initially named Tushita Retreat Centre. It was later renamed Tushita Meditation Centre.

References

External links
 Tushita Meditation Centre
Foundation of the Preservation of the Mahayana Tradition (FPMT)
 An Introduction to Tushita (Youtube Video)
 Tushita on Vimeo

Gelug monasteries
Foundation for the Preservation of the Mahayana Tradition